The 2006 Montreal Alouettes finished in first place in the East Division with a 10–8 record. They won their first seven games, only to lose the next six in a row. After ending the losing streak against the Winnipeg Blue Bombers, head coach Don Matthews resigned, expressing undisclosed health issues that were "affecting his ability to perform". General Manager Jim Popp took over on an interim basis finishing the season 2–2. The Alouettes finished first in the East division and defeated the Toronto Argonauts in the East Final before losing the 94th Grey Cup to the BC Lions.

Offseason

CFL draft

Preseason

Regular season

Season Standings

Season schedule

 Games played with colour uniforms.
 Games played with white uniforms.
 Games played with alternate uniforms.
 Games played with alternate uniforms.

Roster

Playoffs

Schedule

 Games played with white uniforms.
 Games played with alternate uniforms.

Scotiabank East Final

Grey Cup

Awards

2006 CFL All-Star Selections
Scott Flory – Offensive Guard

2006 CFL Eastern All-Star Selections
Anthony Calvillo – Quarterback
Ben Cahoon – Receiver
Kerry Watkins – Receiver
Robert Edwards – Running Back
Scott flory – Offensive Guard
Bryan Chiu – Centre
Ed Philion – Defensive Tackle
Timothy Strickland – Linebacker
Damon Duval – Placekicker

2006 Intergold CFLPA All-Star Selections

References

Montreal Alouettes
Montreal Alouettes seasons